Yanshou Town is a town situated in the northeast of Changping District, Beijing, China. Surrounded by parts of Taihang Mountain Range on three sides, Yanshou Town borders Dazhuangke Township and Jiuduhe Town in its north, Qiaozi Town in its east, Xingshou and Cuicun Towns in its south, and Shisanling Town in its west. It had a census population of 7,766 as of 2020.

This town was created from parts of Changling and Xingshou Towns in 2011. It was named after Yanshou Temple within its border.

Administrative divisions 
So far in 2021, Yanshou Town is made up of 17 villages:

Gallery

See also 

 List of township-level divisions of Beijing

References 

Changping District
Towns in Beijing